Enrico Pezzi (born 24 September 1989) is an Italian footballer who plays for Forlì.

Club career
On 9 August 2018, he signed a two-year contract with Serie B club Carpi.

On 16 August 2020 he moved to Vis Pesaro. On 4 January 2021, he was loaned by Pistoiese.

On 8 September 2021 he joined Forlì in Serie D.

References

1989 births
Sportspeople from Rimini
Living people
Italian footballers
Rimini F.C. 1912 players
A.C. Bellaria Igea Marina players
S.S.D. Lucchese 1905 players
U.S. Triestina Calcio 1918 players
F.C. Pavia players
U.S. Città di Pontedera players
Benevento Calcio players
A.S. Cittadella players
A.C. Carpi players
Vis Pesaro dal 1898 players
U.S. Pistoiese 1921 players
Forlì F.C. players
Serie B players
Serie C players
Serie D players
Association football defenders
Footballers from Emilia-Romagna